Siren is the sixth solo album by Susumu Hirasawa.

Overview
As with the previous album Sim City, it was greatly influenced by Hirasawa's trips to Thailand and continues that album's style and concepts.

Starting from fertility goddesses and a "mermaid legend" he heard (possibly Suvannamaccha), Hirasawa investigated legends from around the world to see how much the ideals represented by the country's transsexuals (with whom he spent most of his time in the country with) manifest in their myths, which led him to discover the same frequent pattern of fertility goddesses seducing humans and associations with gender variance or androgyny. He also interpreted such ideas as the Gemini myth and the concept of yin and yang as examples of things possessing attributes of both genders.

The conclusion that Hirasawa derived from his research is that no matter what culture one is from, the balance between masculinity and femininity is a valued concept. If this balance peacefully exists in one human being, they can be likened to a god in that respect, with Thai transsexuals being the ideal example of this.

Although though this relatively abstract idea was the driving concept behind the album, Hirasawa tried to express it in a listener-friendly way through a story and easy to understand lyrics. He intended to evoke a primitive and naturalistic mythology based on harmony and coexistence with nature. For songwriting, Hirasawa elected to use as few English words as possible and avoid pop song-like structure, which imposed quite a bit of restriction on him. The process contained a large amount of experimentation and combination that rendered him more of a listener than a performer.

One of Hirasawa's aims with the album is to create music that will cause everyone who listens to it to be unified in action, which is reflected on the album's title: a play on the double meaning of "siren", which alludes to both the alarm mechanism and the mythological creatures. For Hirasawa, it was fascinating that people synchronize their actions with everyone else when a siren alarm goes off, and he found it similar to the way that men who hear the siren creature's song drop everything to sail in her direction.

Track listing

Personnel
Susumu Hirasawa – vocals, electric guitar, synthesizers, miburi, sampler, drum machine, amiga, sequencer, programming, production
 – vocals (uncredited)
Yūichi Kenjo – production (executive)
Masanori Chinzei – engineering
Yosuke Komatu – photography

Release history

"Siren *Seiren*" (titled "Siren"), "Gemini" and "Sairen *Siren*" (titled "M-2") were included in the "Hospital" album digest cassette.
"Sairen *Siren*", "Siren *Seiren*" and "Nurse Cafe" were included in the "Siren – Promotion Enchanced CD" promotional enhanced CD.

References

External links
 Introduction to Interactive Live Show 1996 "SIREN - Unreal Soprano"
 Online playable "Unreal Soprano" at Nippon Columbia's archived website - first page

1996 albums
Susumu Hirasawa albums
Nippon Columbia albums